Downtown Garland station (formerly known as Garland Central Transit Center until 2002) is a DART Light Rail station located in Garland, Texas (USA) at Walnut and Fifth Streets. It reopened November 18, 2002, serving the downtown Garland area including Garland City Hall, Historic Downtown Garland and Heritage Park.

External links
 DART - Downtown Garland Station

Dallas Area Rapid Transit light rail stations
Railway stations in the United States opened in 2002
Transportation in Garland, Texas
2002 establishments in Texas
Railway stations in Dallas County, Texas